The Northern Territory (NT) occupies the north central part of the continent of Australia. The Northern Territory borders are to the west with Western Australia, the Western Australia border being near the 129° east longitude (129° east). The NT to the south with the South Australian border being the 26th parallel south latitude (26° south). To the east the NT with the Queensland border along the 138° east longitude (138° east).

Climate

The Northern Territory has two distinctive climate zones - a tropical climate in the north and a desert climate in the rest of the territory.

The wet season (October to April) has monsoon rains and sometimes tropical cyclones.

Coastal boundaries
In the Top End of the Territory is a 5500 km coastline, extending from the Joseph Bonaparte Gulf Timor Sea in the west to the Gulf of Carpentaria in the east. The various islands make up another 5500 km of coastline, resulting in a total of almost 11,000 km.

The southern part of the Territory (Central Australia) is extremely arid. Alice Springs and the surrounding communities make the total population of Central Australia around 60,000 people. There are also large Cattle Stations and significant areas protected around the area. Major transportation in Central Australia mainly comes from road and rail. There are many very small settlements scattered across the Territory but the larger population centres are located on the single sealed road that links Darwin to southern Australia, the Stuart Highway, known to locals simply as "the track".

Geographical features
The coastline in the Top End includes three of Australia's largest islands, Groote Eylandt, Bathurst Island and the largest, Melville Island. The highest point in the Territory is Mount Zeil at 1,531 metres (5021.68 ft) and is situated in the MacDonnell Ranges. In the northern part of the territory lies Kakadu National Park, that features wetlands and native wildlife. To the north of that is the Arafura Sea, and to the east Arnhem Land, whose regional centre is Maningrida on the Liverpool River delta.

Much of the Territory is relatively flat, but has some disconnected ranges, including the sandstone plateau of western Arnhem Land. Long mountain ranges are more a feature of Central Australia, these include the MacDonnell Ranges, the Petermann Ranges, and Harts Range. The Northern Territory also has the natural rock formations of Uluru and Kata Tjuta, which are sacred to the local Aboriginal people.

The northern portion of the territory is principally tropical savannas, composed of several distinct ecoregions – Arnhem Land tropical savanna, Carpentaria tropical savanna, Kimberley tropical savanna, Victoria Plains tropical savanna, and Mitchell Grass Downs. The southern portion of the territory is covered in deserts and xeric shrublands, including the Great Sandy-Tanami desert, Simpson Desert, and Central Ranges xeric scrub. Each ecoregion consists of one or more IBRA regions.

The Northern Territory has the two largest deserts in Australia, the Tanami Desert (184,500 km)2 in the northern part of the Territory, and the Simpson Desert (176,500 km)2 of Central Australia.

There is a series of river systems in the Northern Territory that include Alligator Rivers, Daly River (with its major tributary the Katherine River), Finke River, McArthur River, Roper River, Todd River and Victoria River. The Hay River is east of Alice Springs, with the Marshall River, Arthur Creek, Camel Creek and Bore Creek as tributaries.

References

 
Northern